The Makwanpur Gadhi is a fort in Makwanpur District, Bagmati Province.

The Battle of Makwanpur (1762), the Battle of Makwanpur (1763), and the Battle of Makwanpur (1816) were fought in this fort.

In 2015, the Government of Nepal issued stamps featuring the Makwanpur Gadhi.

References

Further reading 

 
 

Forts in Nepal
History of Nepal
Buildings and structures in Makwanpur District